The Huabiao Award for Outstanding New Actor was first awarded in 1998.

Winners & nominations

2010s

2000s

1990s

References

Huabiao Awards
1998 establishments in China
Awards established in 1998
Film awards for male debut actors